Action fiction is a literary genre that focuses on stories that involve high-stakes, high-energy, and fast-paced events. This genre includes a wide range of subgenres, such as spy novels, adventure stories, tales of terror and intrigue ("cloak and dagger") and mysteries.  This kind of story utilizes suspense, the tension that is built up when the reader wishes to know how the conflict between the protagonist and antagonist is going to be resolved or what the solution to the puzzle of a thriller is.

Genre fiction
Action fiction is a form of genre fiction whose subject matter is characterized by emphasis on exciting action sequences. This does not always mean they exclude character development or story-telling.  Action fiction is related to other forms of fiction, including action films, action games and analogous media in other formats such as manga and anime. It  includes martial arts action, extreme sports action, car chases and vehicles, suspense action, and action comedy, with each focusing in more detail on its own type and flavor of action. It is usually possible to tell from the creative style of an action sequence, the emphasis of an entire work, so that, for example, the style of a combat sequence will indicate whether the entire work can be classified as action adventure, or a martial work. Action is mainly defined by a central focus on any kind of exciting movement.

List of action novels
 58 Minutes (1987)
 The Bourne Identity (1980)
 The Chinaman (1992)
 The Equalizer (2014)
 First Blood (1972)
 Man on Fire (1980)
 Nothing Lasts Forever (1979)

See also
 Action-adventure game
 List of genres
 Pace (narrative)
 Spy fiction
 Thriller novel

Notes

References

External links

 
Literary genres
Fiction-writing mode
Narratology